Pittieria is a genus of predatory air-breathing land snails, terrestrial pulmonate gastropod mollusks in the family Spiraxidae.

Distribution 
The distribution of the genus Pittieria extends from Central Mexico to northern Panama.

Species 
Species in the genus Pittieria include:

Subgenus Pittieria Von Martens, 1901 include two species:
 Pittieria bicolor Von Martens, 1901 - type species
 Pittieria pittieri (Von Martens, 1901)

Subgenus Laeviglandina Pilsbry, 1908 include nine species:
 Pittieria aurantiaca (Angas, 1879)
 Pittieria broctontomlini (Pilsbry, 1926)
 Pittieria chiriquiensis (Da Costa, 1900)
 Pittieria decidua (Pfeiffer, 1861)
 Pittieria izabellina (Pfeiffer, 1846)
 Pittieria lanceolata (Von Martens, 1891)
 Pittieria obtusa (Pfeiffer, 1844)
 Pittieria tryoniana Pilsbry, 1908
 Pittieria underwoodi (Fulton, 1897)

Subgenus Shuttleworthia H. B. Baker, 1941 include three species:
 Pittieria ambigua (Pfeiffer, 1856)
 Pittieria arborea H. B. Baker, 1941
 Pittieria difficilis (Crosse and Fischer, 1869)

References 

Spiraxidae